The North-East Region of Singapore is one of the five regions in the country. The region is the most densely populated and has the highest population among the five, with Sengkang being its most populous town as of 2020 and Seletar as the regional centre. Comprising 13,810 hectares, it includes seven planning areas and is largely a residential region with 217,120 homes. Housing largely consists of high-density HDB public housing estates, however private housing is also present in the region. As its name implies, it is located in the north-eastern part of Singapore.

The North-East Region, along with the four other planning regions, was officially established by the Urban Redevelopment Authority in 1999. Prior to the 1970s, the region was predominantly rural and experienced very little urbanisation. It was only with the development of towns such as Ang Mo Kio and Hougang over the next few decades that the region began to grow significantly in population and experienced dramatic urban development. As of 2020, the North-East Region has a population of 930,910. While predominantly a residential region, the North-East Region is also home to tourist attractions, such as Pulau Ubin and Coney Island. The region has a number of hospitals, parks, educational facilities, and security and defence services. There are also a variety of transport options, including Mass Rapid Transit, Light Rail Transit and public bus services, facilitating transport within and outside the region.

History 
Before the 1960s, the North-East Region was primarily made up of farmland and rainforest. At this time the majority of urbanisation in Singapore was concentrated in the southern part of the country, where the Central Region is now located. The first Master Plan was adopted in 1958. The Master Plan was a statutory plan which regulated land use and development over a 20-year period, to be reviewed every five years. One of the main aims of this plan was to establish New Towns away from the Central Region, laying the precedent for the North-East Region’s urban development. However, this plan was soon deemed inefficient and not flexible enough to accommodate the rapid demographic and economic development in Singapore. In 1971 the Concept Plan was introduced, a more long-term plan which rather than providing a detailed guide for urban planning, it simply provided a general direction for development over the next 40 to 50 years. These two combined planning processes (The Master Plan and the Concept Plan) continue to be revised every few years, led by the Urban Redevelopment Authority. 

It was over the next few decades that towns within the North East Region were built up. The first new towns were Ang Mo Kio and Hougang. Ang Mo Kio New Town began development in 1973 and Hougang in 1979. Up until the 1990s, the North-East Region was included as part of the Rural Planning Area. This area consisted of most of the land outside of the Central Planning Area. However, under the 1991 Concept Plan, the country was officially organised into five regions, along with 55 subdivision. Thus, the North East Region was established. This system allowed for more area specific planning and detailed land use guides.

Geography
It borders Singapore's East Region to the east, Central Region to the south and North Region to the west.

Government
The North-East Region is governed locally by four different Community Development Councils, namely the Central CDC, North East CDC, North West CDC and South East CDC.

Planning Areas
The North-East Region is divided into 7 different planning areas, with a total of 48 subzones.

Demographics 
According to the Singapore Department of Statistics’ 2020 Population Trends report, the total population of the North-East Region is 930,910. Out of its 7 planning areas, Sengkang is the most populated, with 249,370 residents. Alternatively, the North-Eastern Islands is the least populated area with only 50 residents, as it is one of the few areas in Singapore that has not experienced dramatic urban development.

According to the 2015 General Household Survey, the most common ethnic background in the North-East Region is Chinese, accounting for the majority of the population. Additionally, English is the most common language spoken at home (35.4%), closely followed by Mandarin (33.9%). Other common languages spoken at home include other Chinese dialects (13.4%), Malay (7.8%) and Tamil (3.5%). The most popular religion followed is Buddhism (36.3%), while other prevalent religions in the region include Christianity (19.3%), Taoism (11.1%), Islam (9.1%) and Hinduism (4.6%). In addition, 19.1% of people practise no religion.

Economy

Aviation
The region is home to the Seletar Aerospace Park, which houses several aviation manufacturing and research facilities owned by companies such as Rolls-Royce, Pratt & Whitney and Singapore Technologies Aerospace, allowing the aviation industry in Singapore to expand out of Changi, which is a major aviation and commercial zone located in the East region of the country. Several industrial zones are also located within the region such as Defu Industrial Estate in Hougang and Ang Mo Kio Industrial Park in Ang Mo Kio.

Tourism
Located within the North-Eastern Islands planning area, Pulau Ubin is a popular tourist attraction with both local and foreign visitors visiting the island as it is one of the last rural areas in Singapore, with an abundance of natural flora and fauna. It is particularly popular for outdoor activities such as mountain biking, as it is home to the Ketam Mountain Bike Park. Additionally, the Chek Jawa wetlands is also a popular attraction due to its array of wildlife and unique biodiversity. Ubin Town is the only settlement on the island and offers a number of restaurants, bicycle rental shops and other small shops catering to tourism.

Coney Island, also known as Pulau Serangoon, is also a popular attraction within the region. Located off the northeastern coast within the planning area of Punggol, Coney island is accessible via two bridges at the eastern and western ends of the island, linking it to the main island. Visitors to the island can participate in activities such as cycling, bird watching and nature walks. Coney Island Park is managed by the National Parks Board and home to a range of different habitats and a variety of fauna and flora.

Infrastructure

Education
Residents living within the area have access to different educational facilities ranging from preschools to primary and secondary schools as these are located around the different towns in the North-East region. 

There are 28 secondary schools within the North-East Region, including:

 Anderson Secondary School
 Ang Mo Kio Secondary School
 Bowen Secondary School
 CHIJ St. Joseph's Convent
 CHIJ St. Nicholas Girls' School
 Compassvale Secondary School
 Deyi Secondary School
 Edgefield Secondary School
 Greendale Secondary School
 Holy Innocents' High School
 Hougang Secondary School
 Mayflower Secondary School
 Montfort Secondary School
 Nan Chiau High School
 North Vista Secondary School
 Paya Lebar Methodist Girls' School
 Pei Hwa Secondary School
 Peicai Secondary School
 Presbyterian High School
 Punggol Secondary School
 Seng Kang Secondary School
 Serangoon Garden Secondary School
 Serangoon Secondary School
 St. Gabriel's Secondary School
 Xinmin Secondary School
 Yio Chu Kang Secondary School
 Yuying Secondary School
 Zhonghua Secondary School

There are also 44 primary schools within the region, including: 

 Anchor Green Primary School
 Anderson Primary School
 Ang Mo Kio Primary School
 CHIJ Our Lady of Good Counsel
 CHIJ Our Lady of the Nativity
 CHIJ St. Nicholas Girls' School
 Compassvale Primary School
 Edgefield Primary School
 Fern Green Primary School
 Fernvale Primary School
 Greendale Primary School
 Holy Innocents' Primary School
 Horizon Primary School
 Hougang Primary School
 Jing Shan Primary School
 Mayflower Primary School
 Mee Toh School
 Montfort Junior School
 Nan Chiau Primary School
 North Spring Primary School
 North Vista Primary School
 Northshore Primary School
 Oasis Primary School
 Palm View Primary School
 Paya Lebar Methodist Girls' School
 Punggol Cove Primary School
 Punggol Green Primary School
 Punggol Primary School
 Punggol View Primary School
 Rivervale Primary School
 Rosyth School
 Seng Kang Primary School
 Sengkang Green Primary School
 Springdale Primary School
 St. Gabriel's Primary School
 Teck Ghee Primary School
 Townsville Primary School
 Valour Primary School
 Waterway Primary School
 Xinghua Primary School
 Xinmin Primary School
 Yangzheng Primary School
 Yio Chu Kang Primary School
 Zhonghua Primary School

The area is also home to various tertiary institutions such as, Anderson Serangoon Junior College, ITE College Central, Nanyang Junior College, Nanyang Polytechnic and the Singapore Institute of Technology. There are also 3 international schools, namely, the Australian International School Singapore, the French School of Singapore and the Global Indian International School Singapore.

Healthcare 
Sengkang General Hospital is the largest hospital in the region. The 1000-bed hospital was opened on the 18th of August 2018 and is managed by SingHealth. Other hospitals in the North-East region include Ang Mo Kio - Thye Hua Kwan Hospital, Bright Vision Hospital and Sengkang Community Hospital, which is attached to Sengkang General Hospital.

Parklands 
There are a number of parks within the region, all of which are managed by the National Parks Board.

Parks within the North-East region include:

 Ang Mo Kio Town Garden East
 Ang Mo Kio Town Garden West
 Chek Jawa
 Coney Island
 Japanese Cemetery Park
 Ketam Mountain Bike Park
 Pulau Ubin
 Punggol Park
 Punggol Point Park
 Punggol Waterway Park
 Sengkang Riverside Park
 Sengkang Sculpture Park

Fire Department 
The Singapore Civil Defence Force operates two fire stations in the region:

 Ang Mo Kio Fire Station
 Sengkang Fire Station

Ang Mo Kio Fire Station has been operational since 1984 and provides services to Ang Mo Kio and Serangoon. 

Sengkang Fire Station has been operational since 2001 and provides services to Hougang, Punggol, Sengkang and Serangoon.

Along with the fire stations, there are also two fire posts in the region:

 Punggol North Fire Post
 Cheng San Fire Post

Transportation 
The public transport system in Singapore was designed to connect the North-East Region to the city centre, with Mass Rapid Transit (MRT) stations in each town centre. There is also a number of bus stops and Light Rail Transit (LRT) stations which connect towns within the region. As of 2015, 59.5% of the working population aged fifteen and older use public transport regularly to get to work. The North East region also has one airport: Seletar Airport. The airport was formally a military airbase, but is now owned by the Singapore government and operated by Changi Airport Group. It is mostly used for flight training, private aircraft and chartered flights.

Rail 

There are three MRT lines that operate in the North-East Region: North East line, North-South line and Circle Line. The North East line is the most prominent. It runs from HarbourFront station in the Central Region to Punggol station in the north, connecting six MRT stations within the North-East Region, namely Serangoon, Kovan, Hougang, Buangkok, Sengkang and Punggol stations. In 2024 the line is expected to be extended to include the Punggol Coast MRT station, which is under construction. Yio Chu Kang and Ang Mo Kio are the stations located on the North-South line in this region. Tai Seng, Bartley, Serangoon and Lorong Chuan stations are on the Circle line in this region.

In addition, the Cross Island MRT line, which is currently under planning, is expected to cross through the region. Plans for the project were first announced in 2013, and the Land Transport Authority expects that it will be completed by 2030. The line will connect to Ang Mo Kio station, Hougang station, Punggol station and Riviera station, along with future MRT stations including Serangoon North station, Defu station, Tavistock station and Teck Ghee station.

There are also 28 operational LRT stations in the region, connecting residential areas to the MRT lines. There are two main LRT lines in the region: the Punggol LRT line and the Sengkang LRT line.

Bus 

The North-East Region has an established public bus network and a number of bus interchanges connecting towns within the region and to other parts of the country.

The following bus interchanges are located within the North-East Region:

 Ang Mo Kio Bus Interchange
 Compassvale Bus Interchange
 Hougang Central Bus Interchange
 Punggol Temporary Bus Interchange
 Sengkang Bus Interchange
 Serangoon Bus Interchange
 Yio Chu Kang Bus Interchange

Expressways 
There are four expressways that pass through the North East Region: Central Expressway, Seletar Expressway, Tampines Expressway and Kallang–Paya Lebar Expressway. Additionally, the North–South Corridor, an under-construction expressway, is planned to connect to Ang Mo Kio.

Housing 

The North-East Region is predominantly a residential area. Like other regions outside the city centre, towns in the North-East Region are largely made up of high-density, high-rise public housing, provided by the Housing and Development Board (HDB). HDB estates make up 78.72% of households in the region. Each of these housing developments are designed for self-sufficiency, with schools, hospitals, parks, sports facilities, shopping malls and other amenities easily available to residents. The North-East Region experiences continual development of housing and other public facilities. New housing in Ang Mo Kio, Hougang and Serangoon is being developed, along with new transport options, parks and other amenities. In recent years, the HDB has also developed more of a focus on sustainability and incorporating ecological considerations into town planning. The town of Punggol was branded as the “first eco-town”, with more greenery incorporated into the area, along with the development of the Punggol Promenade and Waterway.

While the majority of housing in the region is still public, some have noted that there has also been an increase in private housing in the North East Region. Excluding the Central Region, the North East Region accounted for 40.3% of all private residential sales transactions in Singapore in 2019.

Landmarks

Historic sites 
The National Heritage Board has designated a number of “historic sites” in Singapore, some of which are located in the North-East Region. These include: 

 Chee Tong Temple, located in Hougang and finally completed in 1987.
 Church of the Nativity of the Blessed Virgin Mary, a Roman Catholic church built in Hougang in 1853. 
 Masjid Haji Yusoff, the oldest mosque in Hougang, originally built in 1921.
 Paya Lebar Methodist Church, a church located in Hougang. It was established in 1932 and completed in 1998. 
 Seletar Airfield, a British Royal Air Force base designed to protect the naval base in Sembawang during World War II. 
 St. Paul's Church, an Anglican church built in Hougang in 1936.
 Tou Mu Kung, a Taoist temple completed in 1921. It is the oldest temple in Singapore dedicated to the worship of Jiu Huang Ye. 
 Woodbridge Museum, established in 1993, provides information and exhibitions surrounding the history of the old Woodbridge Hospital, which has now become the Institute of Mental Health. The hospital dates back to 1841, where it was the first medical facility in Singapore for treating the mentally ill. It was also used during World War II to provide treatment to soldiers and civilians.
 Zi Yun Kai Ji Gong, a complex of three temples completed in 1996. The three temples are Keat Sun Beo, Kai Hock Tong and Chao Ying Kong.

References

External links
North-East Region, Singapore

 
Planning areas in Singapore
Regions of Singapore